Abhishek Malik (born 23 May 1990) is an Indian actor who primarily works in Hindi television. He made his acting debut in 2012 with Chhal- Sheh Aur Maat portraying Rishi Shekhawat. Malik is best known for portraying Harshad Saxena in Kaisi Yeh Yaariaan, Rohan Srivastav in Yeh Hai Mohabbatein and Rohan Sippy in Kahaan Hum Kahaan Tum.

Malik participated in MTV Splitsvilla 7. Since June 2022, he is seen portraying Yuvraj Shekhawat in Muskuraane Ki Vajah Tum Ho.

Personal life
Malik was born on 23 May 1990 in New Delhi. He married his girlfriend stylist Suhani Chaudhary on 18 October 2021.

Career
Malik started off by winning the title of Mr. Delhi in 2009, going on to walk the ramp for designers like Manish Malhotra and Rohit Bal. He made his television debut in 2012 with Colors TV's Chhal-Sheh Aur Maat as Rishi Shekhawat. In 2013, he appeared as Rahul in Sony TV's Dil Ki Nazar Se Khoobsurat and Rohan Dubey in Zee TV's Punar Vivah - Ek Nayi Umeed. The following year, Malik participated in MTV India's Splitsvilla 7 and portrayed Harshad Saxena in Kaisi Yeh Yaariaan.

In 2015, he joined &TV's Bhagyalaxmi as Varun Shukla. Two years later, he starred in Ek Vivah Aisa Bhi as Ranveer Mittal. Next, he played Rohan Srivastava in Star Plus's Yeh Hai Mohabbatein. Since June 2019, he has been portraying Rohan Sippy in Star Plus's Kahaan Hum Kahaan Tum opposite Dhwani Shah.

Filmography

Television

Films

Web series

References

External links
 

21st-century Indian male actors
1990 births
Living people
Indian male television actors
Male actors in Hindi television
Indian male models
Male actors from New Delhi
People from New Delhi